In the Fishtank 10 is a 2003 EP by Motorpsycho and Jaga Jazzist Horns, recorded in 2002 during their European tour and released via the Konkurrent label in 2003. Motorpsycho did a handful of gigs together with the horn section of Jaga Jazzist and used the opportunity to record their addition to the Fishtank series.

The style differs heavily from both Motorpsycho and Jaga Jazzist records, consisting of mainly jazz fusion. The first three tracks can be described as rather soothing, with track 2 (a reworking of the song from Angels and Daemons at Play) as a highlight. "Theme de Yoyo," a cover of the Art Ensemble of Chicago song, steps partly into free jazz and "Tristano" is built around a hypnotic bassline (a recurring trademark of Motorpsycho) and clocks in at nearly 21 minutes, making it the second-longest studio track the band has recorded (the longest being the title track off of Little Lucid Moments).

Although this release runs over 46 minutes, it is still regarded as an EP due to the number of songs, the usage of a re-worked older song and a cover tune.

Track listing
"Bombay Brassiere" (Horntveth) – 5:57
"Pills, Powders and Passion Plays" (Sæther) – 7:05
"Doffen Ah Um" (Munkeby/Sæther) – 4:57
"Theme de Yoyo" (F. Bass/L. Bowie/M. Favors/J. Jarman/R. Mitchell/F.D. Moye) – 7:28
"Tristano" (Ryan) – 20:53

Personnel
Motorpsycho:
Bent Sæther: bass, guitar, prepared piano, solina string ensemble, percussion, vocals
Hans Magnus Ryan: guitars, bass
Håkon Gebhardt: drums, percussion
with:
Baard Slagsvold: grand piano, clavinette, nord electro, vocals

Jaga Jazzist Horns:
Mathias Eick: trumpet, marimba, percussion, vocals
Lars Horntveth: tenor sax, bass-clarinet, marimba, vibraphone, percussion, vocals
Jørgen Munkeby: flute, tenor sax, clarinet, marimba, percussion, vocals

External links 
Konkurrent

10
Motorpsycho albums
Split EPs
2003 EPs
Konkurrent EPs
Jaga Jazzist albums